KB Vllaznia is a professional basketball team based in Shkodër, Albania. The club is one of the major basketball teams in Albania, having won 9 leagues, 12 cups and one supercup. The club, founded in 1919, is the oldest in the country.

Trophies
Albanian Leagues: 9
1967, 1990, 1993, 1997, 1998, 2000, 2014, 2015, 2015-16
Albanian Cups: 12
1957, 1958, 1966, 1967, 1968, 1981, 1985, 1994, 1996, 1998, 2014, 2015 
Albanian Supercup: 1
1999

Current roster

Season by season

Notable players
Johnathan Stove (born 1995), basketball player for Hapoel Galil Elyon of the Israeli Basketball Premier League

References

External links
Eurobasket.com KB Vllaznia Page

Vllaznia
Sport in Shkodër
Basketball teams established in 1919